Diploria is a monotypic genus of massive reef building stony corals in the family Mussidae.  It is represented by a single species, Diploria labyrinthiformis, commonly known as grooved brain coral and is found in the western Atlantic Ocean and Caribbean Sea. It has a familiar, maze-like appearance.

Description

This species of reef-building coral has a hemispherical, brain-like shape with a brown, yellow, or grey colour. It has characteristic deep, interconnected double-valleys. These polyp-bearing valleys are each separated by grooved ambulacral ridges. There may be a difference in colour between the valleys and the grooves.

During its planktonic larval stage, the coral has locomotion. After that time, it becomes permanently sessile.

This species is a suspension feeder, and survives mainly on zooplankton and bacteria. These are captured by the polyps, by extruding mesenterial filaments and tentacles. The polyps have nematocysts which are triggered to hold their prey immobile. The prey is then transported to the mouth with the assistance of mucus and cilia.

Diploria labyrinthiformis is hermaphroditic, and reproduces through broadcast spawning. This entails eggs and sperm being released by adult colonies, followed by fertilization and the development of larvae at the water surface. Unlike most other Caribbean broadcast spawners, Diploria labyrinthiformis spawns over multiple months from the late spring until even mid-autumn.

Distribution and habitat
Diploria labyrinthiformis is found in tropical parts of the west Atlantic Ocean, the Gulf of Mexico, the Caribbean Sea, the southern tip of Florida, the Bahamas, Bermuda and the coasts of Central America.

Relationships with other species

Symbiotic

Diploria labyrinthiformis hosts Zooxanthella, a symbiotic dinoflagellate alga. The alga benefits from being in a protective environment in an elevated position. The coral benefits from the nutrients produced photosynthetically by the alga which provides part of its needs for growth and calcification.

The coral also has a relationship with Diadema antillarum, the long-spined urchin, whose grazing helps to reduce the effects of shading, as well as the overgrowth of macroalgae.

Predators

Despite the polyps being equipped with nematocysts, various species prey upon Diploria labyrinthiformis. These include:
Gastropods
Polychaetes (annelid worms)
Sea urchins
Starfishes
Sea spiders
Parrotfish and other fishes

Parasites

This species is host to a parasite in the Corallovexiidae family:
Corallovexia brevibrachium is both an ectoparasite and an endoparasite.

Taxonomy
In the past, other species were classified as pertaining to the Diploria genus. Some of those species are now classified as Pseudodiploria, a genus erected in 2012, such as P. strigosa and P. clivosa.

Postage stamps
Images of Diploria labyrinthiformis appear on three postage stamps: a 75 cent Belizean stamp created by Georges Declercq, a 15 cent stamp from United States issued 1980-08-26 and a 54 Euro cent stamp from Mayotte.

See also
Brain coral
Colpophyllia natans (large-grooved brain coral)

References

External links
Image of postage stamp from Belize
Image of postage stamp from Mayotte

Science.gov topics: Diploria labyrinthiformis

Faviinae
Corals described in 1758
Taxa named by Carl Linnaeus
Taxa named by Henri Milne-Edwards
Taxa named by Jules Haime
Scleractinia genera